Luis Clemente Tiant Vega (born November 23, 1940) is a Cuban former Major League Baseball (MLB) right-handed starting pitcher. He pitched in MLB for 19 years, primarily for the Cleveland Indians and the Boston Red Sox.

Tiant compiled a 229–172 record with 2416 strikeouts, a 3.30 earned run average (ERA), 187 complete games, and 49 shutouts in  innings. He was an All-Star for three seasons and 20-game winner for four seasons. He was the American League (AL) ERA leader in 1968 and 1972. He also was the AL leader in strikeouts per nine innings pitched in 1967 and the AL leader in shutouts in 1966, 1968, and 1974.

He was inducted to the Boston Red Sox Hall of Fame in 1997, the Hispanic Heritage Baseball Museum Hall of Fame in 2002, the Venezuelan Baseball Hall of Fame and Museum in 2009, and the Baseball Reliquary's Shrine of the Eternals in 2012.

Tiant was considered for election to the National Baseball Hall of Fame via voting of the Baseball Writers' Association of America from 1988 to 2002, and by the Hall of Fame's era committees in 2011, 2014, and 2017, falling short of the required votes for induction each time.

Early years

Tiant is the only child of Luis Tiant Sr. and Isabel Vega. From 1926 through 1948, the senior Tiant was a great left-handed pitcher for the Negro league's New York Cubans during the summer and the Cuban professional league's Cienfuegos in the winter, his heroics being followed by hundreds of thousands of Cubans. Luis, Jr. followed in his father's footsteps at an early age, joining both the local Little and Juvenile baseball leagues and rising to a star.

Cuba and Mexico
The 16 year-old Tiant was picked for the Cuban Juvenile League All-Star team in 1957.  His talent drew the attention of former Cleveland Indians All-Star, Bobby Ávila, who was scouting for talent in Cuba. Avila recommended him to the Mexico City Tigers of the Mexican League. Tiant was signed in 1959 for $150 a month, and for the next three years he divided his time between the Tigers and the Havana Sugar Kings in the International League.

Cleveland Indians system
At the end of the summer of 1961, and under Avila's recommendation, Cleveland purchased Tiant's contract for $35,000. But with the rise of Fidel Castro's regime in his native Cuba—specifically, after heightened tensions following the US-sponsored Bay of Pigs invasion in April of that year—it was impossible for Tiant to return home. He would not see his parents for 14 years.

Tiant progressed through the Indians' farm system beginning in 1962 with Charleston of the Eastern League, then on to Burlington, N.C., where he was one of the best pitchers in the Carolina League in 1963 and Portland, Oregon, in 1964. Tiant recalled that at Charleston, "I couldn't speak very good English but I understand racism. They treated me like a dog, but when I got to Portland, I didn't have any problems " (Oregonian, September 6, 2010). After a 15–1 record at Triple-A Portland which included a no-hitter and a one-hitter in consecutive starts, Tiant was called up by the Indians.

MLB career

Cleveland Indians

On July 19, 1964, Tiant debuted in the major leagues for the Cleveland Indians with a four-single, 11 strikeout, 3–0 shutout victory against the defending AL Champion New York Yankees at Yankee Stadium. The losing pitcher was Whitey Ford. Tiant finished his rookie season with a 10–4 record, 105 strikeouts, and a 2.83 ERA in 19 games.

His four consecutive shutouts are matched by only four other pitchers in the 50-year expansion era, with Don Drysdale (six, 1968), Bob Gibson (five, 1968), Orel Hershiser (five) and Gaylord Perry (four) being the others. Besides this, opposing hitters batted just .168 off Tiant, a major league record, and on July 3 he struck out 19 Minnesota Twins in a ten-inning game, setting an American League record for games of that length. With Sam McDowell, Sonny Siebert, and others, the Indians staff led the AL in strikeouts for five consecutive years, including a record 1189 strikeouts in 1967, a record that would stand for 30 years.

Minnesota Twins
With Minnesota, Tiant began  with six wins, but then he fractured his right scapula, essentially ending his season and, some felt, his career. He showed some promise in the  spring training, but he was released.

Boston Red Sox

The Braves signed him to a minor league contract to play with their Triple-A Richmond, where he pitched well, and was acquired by the Louisville Colonels, a farm team of the Boston Red Sox.  Tiant reinvented himself as a pitcher by altering his delivery so that he turned away from home plate during his motion, in effect creating a hesitation pitch. According to Tiant, the new motion was a response to a drop in his velocity due to a shoulder blade injury. Twisting and turning his body into unthinkable positions, Tiant would spend more time looking at second base than he did the plate as he prepared to throw.

He was quickly called back up to the majors, and struggled through 1971 with a 1–7 record and 4.88 ERA.

In the playoffs he bested the three-time defending World Champion Oakland Athletics, allowing only three hits in a 7–1 complete-game victory, then opened the World Series against The Big Red Machine Cincinnati Reds. His father and mother, having been allowed to visit from Cuba under a special visa, were in Fenway Park that game to watch their son defeat the Reds 6–0 in a five-hit shutout.

Tiant won Game 4 as well (throwing 173 pitches in his second complete game in the series) and had a no-decision in Game 6, which has been called the greatest game ever played, after Carlton Fisk's dramatic game-winning walk-off home run in the 12th inning.

New York Yankees
At the end of the 1978 season Tiant signed as a free agent with the Yankees. He compiled a 21–17 record in New York over two seasons from -80.

Pittsburgh Pirates and California Angels
Tiant signed with the Pittsburgh Pirates as a free agent in 1981, pitching in just 9 games and going 2–5 with a 3.92 ERA.  He also appeared in 21 games (all starts) for the Pirates' Triple-A Portland Beavers of the Pacific Coast League, posting a 13–7 record with 3.82 ERA.

He finished his career with a brief stint with the California Angels in 1982, pitching in 6 games and going 2–2 with a 5.76 ERA.

Other leagues
Tiant competed in the Venezuelan Professional Baseball League in parts of seven seasons spanning 1963–1982, while compiling a record of 37–24 including 29 complete games, a 2.27 ERA, and a no-hitter in 1971. He was a member of the champion Leones del Caracas teams of 1966–67 and 1967–68. He gained induction into the Venezuelan Baseball Hall of Fame and Museum in 2009.

Tiant competed in the Senior Professional Baseball Association in 1989, initially signing with the Winter Haven Super Sox. He was subsequently traded to the Gold Coast Suns, in exchange for outfielder Ralph Garr and 500 Teddy Ruxpin toy bears (for use as a fan giveaway item). Tiant had an 0–1 record with 5.00 ERA for the Suns.

Post-playing days

Tiant was a minor league pitching coach in the Los Angeles Dodgers' farm system from 1992 to 1995, and in the Chicago White Sox's farm system in 1997. During the 1996 Summer Olympics, he was the pitching coach for the Nicaraguan team.

Tiant served as the head coach for the baseball team at the Savannah College of Art and Design, an NCAA Division III program, from 1998 to 2001, where his teams compiled a record of 55–97 for a .366 winning percentage.

In 2002, Tiant was the pitching coach for Boston's Class A Short Season affiliate, the Lowell Spinners, and has continued to serve as a special assignment instructor for the Red Sox.

Tiant, along with former batterymate Carlton Fisk, threw out the ceremonial first pitch before what proved to be the Red Sox' championship-winning Game 6 of the 2013 World Series at Fenway Park.

MLB statistics
Tiant's major league stats:

Hall of Fame candidacy
According to election rules at the time, players were permitted on the Baseball Writers of America ballot for a maximum of 15 years.

The Golden Era Committee was replaced in July 2016 by a 16-member Golden Days Committee, to vote from a 10 candidate ballot for the 1950–1969 era. The Golden Days Committee elected its first Hall of Fame members in December 2021 but Tiant was not among them. The Modern Baseball Committee votes for the second time in 2023, for induction into the Hall of Fame's Class of 2024.

Personal life
Tiant and his wife, Maria, have three children: Luis Jr., Isabel, and Daniel.

An avid cigar smoker, Tiant launched a line of cigars that he formulated and designed, branding them with his nickname, El Tiante. Tommy John remembered his cigars only too well from their days in the Indians organization. "Luis would smoke these horrendous, long, Cuban cigars. We'd be on the bus all night, and wake up to a thick blue haze from Tiant's ropes. Tiant had an almost supernatural ability for keeping a cigar lit. Luis would cut up in his high-pitched voice, joking, cackling, and the eternal flame held true. He could even take a shower and keep his stogie going. In the confined space of a bus, the smoke would gag you. He'd fall asleep on the bus, but the cigar would somehow stay alive all night."

Tiant appeared in an episode of Cheers, "Now Pitching, Sam Malone", which first aired on January 6, 1983. Sam Malone (Ted Danson) agrees to do a television beer commercial, co-starring with and "relieving" Tiant when the latter begins to fail in his promotion of the product.

Tiant has authored two autobiographies:
 El Tiante, the Luis Tiant story, written with Joe Fitzgerald, released in 1976
 Son of Havana: A Baseball Journey from Cuba to the Big Leagues and Back, written with Saul Wisnia, released in May 2019

Legacy
Tiant is the subject of the documentary film The Lost Son of Havana, produced by Kris Meyer and the Farrelly brothers, and directed by Jonathan Hock. The story of his return visit to his roots in Cuba had its world premiere on April 23, 2009, at the Tribeca Film Festival, and was promptly acquired by ESPN Films.

See also
List of Major League Baseball players from Cuba
List of Major League Baseball career wins leaders
List of Major League Baseball annual ERA leaders
List of Major League Baseball career strikeout leaders

References

Further reading
Baseball Hall of Fame: Tiant Delivered Over Brilliant Career

Interview with Luis Tiant about cigars and baseball

External links

Red Sox' All-Time Team
The Baseball Page
Baseball Library
Latino Legends in Sports

1940 births
Living people
American League All-Stars
American League ERA champions
Boston Red Sox players
Burlington Indians players (1958–1964)
California Angels players
Charleston Indians players
Cleveland Indians players
College baseball coaches
Diablos Rojos del México players
Gold Coast Suns (baseball) players
Industriales de Valencia players
Jacksonville Suns players
Leones del Caracas players
Cuban expatriate baseball players in Venezuela
Louisville Colonels (minor league) players
Major League Baseball pitchers
Major League Baseball players from Cuba
Cuban expatriate baseball players in the United States
Minnesota Twins players
Minor league baseball coaches
New York Yankees players
People from Southborough, Massachusetts
Pittsburgh Pirates players
Portland Beavers players
Richmond Braves players
Sportspeople from Worcester County, Massachusetts
St. Lucie Legends players
Tiburones de La Guaira players
Tigres del México players
Cuban expatriate baseball players in Mexico
Cuban expatriate baseball players in Nicaragua
Baseball players from Havana